The Theclini are a tribe of butterflies in the family Lycaenidae. As not all Theclinae have been assigned to tribes, the genus list is preliminary.

Genera

 Amblopala
 Antigius
 Araragi
 Artopoetes
 Austrozephyrus
 Chaetoprocta
 Chrysozephyrus
 Cordelia
 Coreana
 Esakiozephyrus
 Euaspa
 Favonius - includes Quercusia
 Goldia
 Gonerilia
 Habrodais
 Howarthia
 Hypaurotis
 Iozephyrus
 Iratsume
 Japonica
 Laeosopis
 Leucantigius
 Nanlingozephyrus
 Neozephyrus
 Protantigius
 Proteuaspa
 Quercusia
 Ravenna
 Saigusaozephyrus
 Shaanxiana
 Shirozua
 Shizuyaozephyrus
 Sibataniozephyrus
 Teratozephyrus
 Thecla
 Thermozephyrus
 Ussuriana
 Wagimo
 Yamamotozephyrus
 Yamatozephyrus

References

 
Taxa named by William John Swainson
Butterfly tribes